Heerlen Woonboulevard is a railway station in Heerlen, the Netherlands.

History
Construction took place in 2010, between 18 January and 3 June, while the station opened on 27 June.

The station was named after the adjacent , a collection of furniture and home decoration shops.

Train services
The following local train services call at this station:
Stoptrein S4: Maastricht–Heerlen

References

External links
NS website 
Dutch public transport travel planner 

Woonboulevard
Railway stations opened in 2010